Parliamentary elections were held in Colombia on 10 May 1931 to elect the Chamber of Representatives. The Liberal Party received the most votes.

Results

Chamber of Representatives

Senate

References

Parliamentary elections in Colombia
Colombia
1931 in Colombia
May 1931 events
Election and referendum articles with incomplete results